Bassir is a village in Hauran, located 630 meters (0.4 miles) above sea level and  southern of Damascus in Syria. Bassir is bordered from the east by Lejah, from the south by Khabab, from the west by Al-Sanamayn and from the north by Jebab. It is situated in the middle of three main cities in Syria: Damascus, Daraa and As-Suwayda.

Etymology
The word Bassir comes from the word "Pethera" that means in Greek "high" or "elevated" being situated in a relatively high location. Basrah being the most common. In Arabic, the word baṣrah means "the overwatcher,"

History
Bassir was built as a military base for Roman forces in order to aid the military regiments scattered in the adjacent region. This region is a rocky area, consisting of volcano and lava stones and is known as "Lajah". Bassir was also a pit stop for caravans traveling between Babylon and Palestine.

In 1596 Bassir appeared in the Ottoman  tax registers as Busayr al-Kubra and was part of the nahiya of Bani Kilab in the Hauran Sanjak. It had an entirely Muslim population consisting of 4 households and 3 bachelors. The villagers paid a fixed tax-rate of 25% on wheat, barley, summer crops, goats and beehives; a total of  2,900 akçe.

In 1838, Buseir was noted as a Catholic village, situated "the Nukra, north of Al-Shaykh Maskin".

Demographics

Population
People from this area are known to be part of the Ghassanid Christians tribes that immigrated in the early 3rd century CE from Yemen to Hauran in southern Syria and established the kingdom of the Ghassanids.

The population is about 3000, but unlike other neighboring villages, Bassir has a very low birth rate and significantly declined through the years. Many people originally from Bassir live in Damascus but yet own homes in the village. As in many other areas of Syria during the time of Ottoman Empire and due to the lack of resources, a notable number of civilians were immigrated to South America including Brazil and Argentina. Other people also were immigrated to adjacent countries i.e. Lebanon and currently live in Beqaa Valley and Alcoura region near Tripoli.

Religion
Bassir's inhabitants are Christians and follow the Melkite Greek Catholic Church. It is similar to what is seen in their neighboring sister villages: Khabab, Izra', Tubna, Shaqra that all their current citizens originally immigrated from Salkhad.

There used to be two ancient Byzantine churches in Bassir: One of them, was built after the conversion to Christianity and entirely demolished. The other church is still buried under the church that is built during the late 19th and early 20th century and is newly renovated. The latter church believed to be first used by the new settler of Bassir.

Education
Bassir is a well known of highlight educated people and it was once called "home of light", because of the high number of educated people that spread the knowledge and education to other surrounding towns throughout the years. During the last 50 years, some people immigrated to many countries such France and United States mostly to pursue higher education. Many famous scientists and scholars were born in this small town including physicians, engineers and politicians.

Architecture
The houses in Bassir are made of volcanic and Lava stones that are currently used to build the new houses of the village.

References

Bibliography

External links
Bassir Website
 Map of the town, Google Maps
 Sanameine-map; 19L

Populated places in Al-Sanamayn District
Melkite Christian communities in Syria